Antonio de Fonseca (1503−19 January 1557) was a Roman Catholic prelate and statesman who served as Bishop of Pamplona (1545-1557).

Biography
Antonio de Fonseca was born in Toro, Spain in 1503 and ordained a priest in the Order of Saint Augustine. On 9 Jan 1545, he was appointed during the papacy of Pope Paul III as Bishop of Pamplona. On 27 Jun 1550, he resigned as Bishop of Pamplona. As word of his death on 19 Jan 1557 had not yet reached the Vatican, he was appointed Patriarch of the West Indies by Pope Paul IV in 1558.

References

External links and additional sources
 (for Chronology of Bishops) 
 (for Chronology of Bishops) 

16th-century Roman Catholic bishops in Spain
Bishops appointed by Pope Paul III
Bishops appointed by Pope Paul IV
1503 births
1557 deaths
People from Zamora, Spain
Bishops of Pamplona